Marik may refer to:

 Marik language, an Austronesian language spoken in Papua New Guinea
 Marik Ishtar, a character in the manga Yu-Gi-Oh!
 Marik Vos-Lundh (1923–1994), a Swedish costume designer and production designer
 Iren Marik (1905–1986), a Hungarian classical pianist
 Michal Mařík, a Czech ice hockey goaltender 
 Paul E. Marik, a professor of medicine and sepsis treatment researcher
 Marik, Iran, a village in Chaharmahal and Bakhtiari Province, Iran 
 28492 Marik, an asteroid
 Marik, another name for Nirig (Mars) in Mandaeism